Tân Hòa is a ward located in Biên Hòa city of Đồng Nai province, Vietnam. It has an area of about 3.9km2 and the population in 2017 was 39,982.

References

Bien Hoa